Nadivi is a village in the Siraguppa taluk of Bellary district in Karnataka state, India.

Demographics
Per the 2011 Census of India, Nadivi has a total population of 3277; of whom 1648 are male and 1629 female.

Importance
Nadivi is famous for the Ancient fort located in the village.

See also
Maski
Siraguppa
Tekkalakote
Bellary

References

Villages in Bellary district
Archaeological sites in Karnataka
Forts in Karnataka